Oskar Reinhard Negt (born 1 August 1934 in Kapkeim, East Prussia) is a philosopher and critical social theorist. He is an emeritus professor of sociology at Leibniz University Hannover, and one of Germany's most prominent social scientists. Little of his work has been translated into English.

Negt studied law and philosophy in the University of Göttingen and the University of Frankfurt am Main as a student of Theodor Adorno, and was an assistant of Jürgen Habermas at the Universität Frankfurt. Negt is most-well known for his long running collaboration with the filmmaker and visual artist Alexander Kluge.

Biography 
Negt was the youngest child of seven, and his father was involved in the Social Democratic Party (SDP) during World War II, who faced pressure under Nazi rule. In 1944, Negt was separated from his parents and displaced to Denmark following the Red Army's invasion of Königsberg. During his stay in Denmark, Negt and two of his older sisters stayed in an internment camp for two and a half years, until which the camp doors were finally reopened and Negt and his sisters were reunited with their parents in Russian occupied Berlin, after having been placed in quarantine near Rostock on their return to Germany. It was during this time that Negt's childhood was deeply affected, missing out on early development with no exposure to childhood schooling.

In 1951, the political pressure mounted on Negt's family from the state, due to his father's involvement in the SDP, Negt's family fled to West Berlin, where they would spend a further 6 months as asylum seekers. In 1955, the Negt family settled into Oldenburg in Lower Saxony.

In 1955 Negt arrived in Göttingen to study law, but found the commitments entailed by membership in the local Burschenschaft overly burdensome. He later left, joined the Socialist German Students' Union (SDS), and enrolled in the Universität Frankfurt (now Goethe University Frankfurt) for the study of sociology and philosophy. It is here that he encountered Max Horkheimer and Adorno, then finally Habermas who was impressed with one of Negt's class papers. Negt was later offered a place as a research assistant for Habermas (on the topic of Marxism and the SDS) at the University of Heidelberg in 1961. In 1968 Negt upset his mentor Habermas by editing a collection of essays on him (titled The Left answers Jurgen Habermas), some of which were highly critical.

Negt published his autobiography in two instalments in 2016 and 2019, titled respectively Überlebensglück (Survivors’ Luck: An Autobiographical Search for Tracks) and Erfahrungsspuren (Tracks of Experience: An Autobiographical Thought-Journey). He also collaborated with the filmmaker Alexander Kluge on three films about post-socialist Europe. Negt's work with Kluge has been described as "highly unconventional" but significant in "an attempt to reinstate the human body to its rightful place in critical theory."

Intellectual influences 
Negt's work is said to be difficult to classify due to the enormous range of influences found in it from so many texts and philosophers. These include Immanuel Kant, Freidrich Hegel, Karl Marx, Auguste Comte, and some of the major Western Marxists. He draws on work in labour sociology, organizational theory, political journalism and more. Negt's primary concerns relate to labor, teaching, and politics.

Negt was brought up as the son of a small farmer and a member of the Social Democratic Party, and this "rural and... proletarian existence" led him to have ties with SPD causes, including trade unions. These experiences led him to feel that while standard education for union members in metal working factories in Germany was sufficient for teaching legal questions, it was insufficient in political education. Negt thus understands genuine education to be inherently political, because democracy must be learned, making education existential for a democratic society. Negt is thus suspicious of the ideology and logic of capital and the market replacing all other forms of social reality. This informs Negt's views on education as the holistic development of the person, limited not only to "processing knowledge and information" but also the ability to deal with emotions, to compromise, negotiate, and share with others. Thus for Negt, "good political education" means that the student can "think for themselves."

Work with Alexander Kluge 
Oskar Negt's most well-known public interventions in politics have been part of his collaboration with the artist Alexander Kluge. Their seminal work Public Sphere and Experience was an analysis of the limits of the bourgeois public sphere, which shaped Public opposition.

Selected bibliography

In English 

 “The Misery of Bourgeois Democracy in Germany”. Telos 34 (Winter 1974). New York: Telos Press.
 Public Sphere and Experience: Analysis of the Bourgeois and Proletarian Public Sphere, Verso; Reprint edition (February 2, 2016) Originally issued as Public Sphere and Experience: Toward an Analysis of the Bourgeois and Proletarian Public Sphere (Theory & History of Literature) by Univ of Minnesota Pr; First edition (December 1, 1993).
 "Adult Education and European Identity". Policy Futures in Education. 6 (6): 744–756. (2013)
 History and Obstinacy (with Alexander Kluge), Zone Books (April 11, 2014)

In German 
 Strukturbeziehungen zwischen den Gesellschaftslehren Comtes und Hegels. Frankfurt a. M. 1964.
 Soziologische Phantasie und exemplarisches Lernen. Zur Theorie der Arbeiterbildung. Frankfurt a. M. 1968.
 Politik als Protest. Reden und Aufsätze zur antiautoritären Bewegung. Frankfurt a. M. 1971.
 (with Alexander Kluge): Öffentlichkeit und Erfahrung. Zur Organisationsanalyse von bürgerlicher und proletarischer Öffentlichkeit. Frankfurt a. M. 1972.
 Keine Demokratie ohne Sozialismus. Über den Zusammenhang von Politik, Geschichte und Moral. Frankfurt a. M. 1976.
 Mit Alexander Kluge: Geschichte und Eigensinn. Geschichtliche Organisation der Arbeitsvermögen – Deutschland als Produktionsöffentlichkeit – Gewalt des Zusammenhangs. Frankfurt a. M. 1981.
 Lebendige Arbeit, enteignete Zeit. Politische und kulturelle Dimensionen des Kampfes um die Arbeitszeit. Frankfurt a. M./New York 1984.
 Alfred Sohn-Rethel. Bremen 1988.
 Modernisierung im Zeichen des Drachen. China und der europäische Mythos der Moderne. Reisetagebuch und Gedankenexperimente. Frankfurt a. M. 1988.
 Die Herausforderung der Gewerkschaften. Plädoyers für die Erweiterung ihres politischen und kulturellen Mandats. Frankfurt a. M./New York 1989.
 (with Alexander Kluge): Maßverhältnisse des Politischen: 15 Vorschläge zum Unterscheidungsvermögen. Frankfurt a. M. 1992
 Kältestrom. Göttingen 1994. 
 Unbotmäßige Zeitgenossen. Annäherungen und Erinnerungen. Frankfurt a. M. 1994.
 Achtundsechzig. Politische Intellektuelle und die Macht. Göttingen 1995.
 Kindheit und Schule in einer Welt der Umbrüche. Göttingen 1997.
 (with Hans Werner Dannowski): Königsberg–Kaliningrad: Reise in die Stadt Kants und Hamanns. Göttingen 1998.
 Warum SPD? 7 Argumente für einen nachhaltigen Macht- und Politikwechsel. Göttingen 1998.
 (with Alexander Kluge): Der unterschätzte Mensch. Frankfurt a. M. 2001. (* 
 Kant und Marx. Ein Epochengespräch. Göttingen 2003.
 Wozu noch Gewerkschaften? Eine Streitschrift. Steidl Verlag, 2004, 
 Die Faust-Karriere. Vom verzweifelten Intellektuellen zum gescheiterten Unternehmer. Göttingen 2006.

References

External links 
 Website at the Institute of Sociology in Hannover
 Biography of Negt

1934 births
Living people
People from Dobre Miasto
People from East Prussia
20th-century German philosophers
Continental philosophers
Marxist theorists
Sozialistischer Deutscher Studentenbund members
Social philosophers
Officers Crosses of the Order of Merit of the Federal Republic of Germany
German male writers